The total synthesis of quinine, a naturally-occurring antimalarial drug, was developed over a 150-year period. The development of synthetic quinine is considered a milestone in organic chemistry although it has never been produced industrially as a substitute for natural occurring quinine. The subject has also been attended with some controversy: Gilbert Stork published the first stereoselective total synthesis of quinine in 2001, meanwhile shedding doubt on the earlier claim by Robert Burns Woodward and William Doering in 1944, claiming that the final steps required to convert their last synthetic intermediate, quinotoxine, into quinine would not have worked had Woodward and Doering attempted to perform the experiment. A 2001 editorial published in Chemical & Engineering News sided with Stork, but the controversy was eventually laid to rest once and for all when Williams and coworkers successfully repeated Woodward's proposed conversion of quinotoxine to quinine in 2007.

Chemical structure
The aromatic component of the quinine molecule is a quinoline with a methoxy substituent. The amine component has a quinuclidine skeleton and the methylene bridge in between the two components has a hydroxyl group. The substituent at the 3 position is a vinyl group. The molecule is optically active with five stereogenic centers (the N1 and C4 constituting a single asymmetric unit), making synthesis potentially difficult because it is one of 16 stereoisomers.

Quinine total synthesis timeline
 1817: First isolation of quinine from cinchona tree by Pierre Joseph Pelletier and Joseph Caventou.
 1853: Louis Pasteur obtains quinotoxine (or quinicine in older literature) by acid-catalysed isomerization of quinine.

 1856: Sir William Henry Perkin attempts quinine synthesis by oxidation of N-allyltoluidine based on the erroneous idea that two equivalents of this compound with chemical formula C10H13N plus three equivalents of oxygen yield one equivalent of  C20H24N2O2 (quinine's chemical formula) and one equivalent of water. His oxidations with other toluidines sets him on the path to discover mauveine. The commercial importance of mauveine eventually lead to the birth of the chemical industry.

 1907: the correct atom connectivity established by Paul Rabe.
 1918: Paul Rabe and Karl Kindler synthesize quinine from quinotoxine, reversing the Pasteur chemistry. The lack of experimental details in this publication would become a major issue in the Stork–Woodward controversy almost a century later.

The first step in this sequence is sodium hypobromite addition to quinotoxine to an N-bromo intermediate possibly with structure 2. The second step is organic oxidation with sodium ethoxide in ethanol. Because of the basic conditions the initial product quininone interconverts with quinidinone via a common enol intermediate and mutarotation is observed. In the third step the ketone group is reduced with aluminum powder and sodium ethoxide in ethanol and quinine can be identified. Quinotoxine is the first relay molecule in the Woodward/Doering claim.

 1939: Rabe and Kindler re investigate a sample left over from their 1918 experiments and identify and isolate quinine (again) together with diastereomers quinidine, epi-quinine and epi-quinidine.
 1940: Robert Burns Woodward signs on as a consultant for the Polaroid Corporation at the request of Edwin H. Land. Quinine is of interest to Polaroid for its light polarizing properties.
 1943: Prelog and Proštenik  interconvert an allylpiperidine called homomeroquinene and quinotoxine. Homomeroquinene (the second relay molecule in the Woodward/Doering claim) is obtained in several steps from the biomolecule cinchonine (related to quinidine but without the methoxy group):

The key step in the assembly of quinotoxine is a Claisen condensation:

 1944: Robert Burns Woodward and W. E. Doering report the synthesis of quinine, starting from 7-hydroxyisoquinoline. Although the title of their one-page publication is The total synthesis of quinine it is oddly not the synthesis of quinine but that of the precursor homomeroquinene (racemic) and then with groundwork already provided by Prelog a year earlier to quinotoxine (enantiopure after chiral resolution) that is described.

Woodward and Doering argue that Rabe in 1918 already proved that this compound will eventually give quinine but do not repeat Rabe's work. In this project 27-year-old assistant professor Woodward is the theorist and postdoc Doering (age 26) the bench worker. According to William, Bob was able to boil water but an egg would be a challenge. As many natural quinine resources were tied up in the enemy-held Dutch East Indies, synthetic quinine was a promising alternative for fighting malaria on the battlefield and both men become instant war heroes making headlines in the New York Times, Newsweek and Life.
 1944: The then 22-year-old Gilbert Stork writes to Woodward asking him if he did repeat Rabe's work.
 1945: Woodward and Doering publish their second lengthy quinine paper. One of the two referees rejects the manuscript (too much historic material, too much experimental details and poor literary style with inclusion of words like adumbrated and apposite) but it is published without changes nonetheless.
 1974: Kondo and Mori synthesize racemic vinylic gamma-lactone,s a key starting material in Stork's 2001 quinine synthesis.

The starting materials are trans-2-butene-1,4-diol and ethyl orthoacetate and the key step is a Claisen rearrangement
 1988: Ishibashi & Taniguchy resolve said lactone to enantiopure compounds  via chiral resolution:

In this process the racemic lactone reacts in aminolysis with (S)-methylbenzylamine assisted by triethylaluminum to a diastereomeric pair of amides which can be separated by column chromatography. The S-enantiomer is converted back to the S-lactone in two steps by hydrolysis with potassium hydroxide and ethylene glycol followed by azeotropic ring closure.
 2001: Gilbert Stork publishes his stereoselective quinine synthesis. He questions the validity of the Woodward/Doering claim: "the basis of their characterization of Rabe’s claim as “established” is unclear". M. Jacobs, writing in The Chemical & Engineering News, is equally critical.

 2007: Researcher Jeffrey I. Seeman in a 30-page review concludes that the Woodward–Doering–Rabe–Kindler total synthesis of quinine is a valid achievement. He notes that Paul Rabe was an extremely experienced alkaloid chemist, that he had ample opportunity to compare his quinine reaction product with authentic samples and that the described 1918 chemistry was repeated by Rabe although not with quinotoxine itself but still with closely related derivatives.
 2008: Smith and Williams revisit and confirm Rabe's d-quinotoxine to quinine route.

 2018: Nuno Maulide and his team report the total synthesis of quinine via C–H activation, including analogues with improved antimalarial activity

Stork quinine total synthesis
The Stork quinine synthesis starts from chiral (S)-4-vinylbutyrolactone 1. The compound is obtained by chiral resolution and in fact, in the subsequent steps all stereogenic centers are put in place by chiral induction: the sequence does not contain asymmetric steps.

The lactone is ring-opened with diethylamine to amide 2 and its hydroxyl group is protected as a tert-butyldimethyl silyl ether (TBS) in 3. The C5 and C6 atoms are added as tert-butyldiphenylsilyl (TBDPS) protected iodoethanol in a nucleophilic substitution of acidic C4 with lithium diisopropylamide (LDA) at −78 °C to 4 with correct stereochemistry. Removal of the silyl protecting group with p-toluenesulfonic acid to alcohol 4b and ring-closure by azeotropic distillation returns the compound to lactone 5 (direct alkylation of 1 met with undisclosed problems).

The lactone is then reduced to the lactol 5b with diisobutylaluminum hydride and its liberated aldehyde reacts in a Wittig reaction with methoxymethylenetriphenylphosphine (delivering the C8 atom) to form enol ether 6. The hydroxyl group is replaced in a Mitsunobu reaction by an azide group with diphenylphosphoryl azide in 7 and acid hydrolysis yields the azido aldehyde 8.

The methyl group in 6-methoxy-4-methylquinoline 9 is sufficiently acidic for nucleophilic addition of its anion (by reaction with LDA) to the aldehyde group in 8 to form 10 as a mixture of epimers. This is of no consequence for stereocontrol because in the next step the alcohol is oxidized in a Swern oxidation to ketone 11. A Staudinger reaction with triphenylphosphine closes the ring between the ketone and the azide to the tetrahydropyridine 12. The imine group in this compound is reduced to the amine 13 with sodium borohydride with the correct stereospecificity. The silyl protecting group is removed with hydrogen fluoride to alcohol 14 and then activated as a mesyl leaving group by reaction with mesyl chloride in pyridine which enables the third ring closure to 15. In the final step the C9 hydroxyl group was introduced by oxidation with sodium hydride, dimethylsulfoxide and oxygen with quinine to epiquinine ratio of 14:1.

Woodward–Doering formal quinine total synthesis 
The 1944 Woodward–Doering synthesis starts from 7-hydroxyisoquinoline 3 for the quinuclidine skeleton which is somewhat counter intuitive because one goes from a stable heterocyclic aromatic system to a completely saturated bicyclic ring. This compound (already known since 1895) is prepared in two steps.

The first reaction step is condensation reaction of 3-hydroxybenzaldehyde 1 with (formally) the diacetal of aminoacetaldehyde to the imine 2 and the second reaction step is cyclization in concentrated sulfuric acid. Isoquinoline 3 is then alkylated in another condensation by formaldehyde and piperidine and the product is isolated as the sodium salt of 4.

Hydrogenation at 220 °C for 10 hours in methanol with sodium methoxide liberates the piperidine group and leaving the methyl group in 5 with already all carbon and nitrogen atoms accounted for. A second hydrogenation takes place with Adams catalyst in acetic acid to tetrahydroisoquinoline 6. Further hydrogenation does not take place until the amino group is acylated with acetic anhydride in methanol but by then 7 is again hydrogenated with Raney nickel in ethanol at 150 °C under high pressure to decahydroisoquinoline 8. The mixture of cis and trans isomers is then oxidized by chromic acid in acetic acid to the ketone 9. Only the cis isomer crystallizes and used in the next reaction step, a ring opening with the alkyl nitrite ethyl nitrite with sodium ethoxide in ethanol to 10 with a newly formed carboxylic ester group and an oxime group. The oxime group is hydrogenated to the amine 11 with platinum in acetic acid and alkylation with iodomethane gives the quaternary ammonium salt 12 and subsequently the betaine 13 after reaction with silver oxide.

Quinine's vinyl group is then constructed by Hofmann elimination with sodium hydroxide in water at 140 °C. This process is accompanied by hydrolysis of both the ester and the amide group but it is not the free amine that is isolated but the urea 14 by reaction with potassium cyanate. In the next step the carboxylic acid group is esterified with ethanol and the urea group replaced with a benzoyl group. The final step is a claisen condensation of 15 with ethyl quininate 16, which after acidic workup yields racemic quinotoxine 17. The desired enantiomer is obtained by chiral resolution with the chiral dibenzoyl ester of Tartaric acid. The conversion of this compound to quinine is based on the Rabe–Kindler chemistry discussed in the timelime.

External links
 Quinine Total Syntheses @ SynArchive.com
 Quinine story at Harvard.edu Link

References

Total synthesis
Quinine